Cà Melone is a small village (curazia) of San Marino. It belongs to the municipality of Borgo Maggiore.

See also
Borgo Maggiore
Cà Rigo
Cailungo
San Giovanni sotto le Penne
Valdragone
Ventoso

Curazie in San Marino
Borgo Maggiore